Jennifer G. Wright (born March 23, 1962) is an American former actress who made her film debut portraying the role of Cushie in the comedy-drama The World According to Garp in 1982. That same year she made an appearance in the live-action/animated psychological musical drama film Pink Floyd – The Wall, playing an American groupie.

Career
Wright had roles in both The Wild Life (1984) as Eileen and St. Elmo's Fire (1985) as Felicia.  She also starred with Anthony Michael Hall in the 1986 thriller Out of Bounds, with Adrian Pasdar as Mae in the 1987 cult horror classic Near Dark, and alongside Ilan Mitchell-Smith in the 1988 drama The Chocolate War.  Wright had a lead role in 1989's I, Madman, and small parts in the films Young Guns II (1990) and The Lawnmower Man (1992).

Filmography

References

External links

Punkglobe.com interview

1962 births
Actresses from New York City
American film actresses
American television actresses
Living people
20th-century American actresses
21st-century American women